Theloderma horridum is a species of frog in the family Rhacophoridae. It is found in Indonesia, Malaysia, Singapore, and Thailand. Its natural habitat is subtropical or tropical moist lowland forests. It is threatened by habitat loss.

References

External links
Amphibian and Reptiles of Peninsular Malaysia - Theloderma horridum

Theloderma
Taxonomy articles created by Polbot
Amphibians described in 1903